Regional Training Regiments (abbreviated Rindam) are Indonesian training centers and regimental depots serving newly recruited enlisted personnel of the 15 Regional Military Commands of the Indonesian Army. These regiments are the regional command's home base for recruiting and training of personnel within their areas of responsibility.

Definition 
Rindams are defined as a military educational institution under the direct control of the Regional Military Command for enlisted and non-commissioned officers (other than Akmil, Seskoad, and Secapa) which have the main task of helping organize military training and education for all ranks of the RMC (Kodam) to produce soldiers who are professional, reliable, quality and have achieved basic military skills and tactical work for peace and wartime actions and are loved by the people not just of their communities but of the country at large.   Rindam has several units in charge of conducting first, vocational and qualification education (Secata, Secaba, Dodiklatpur, Dodikjur, and Dodikbelanegara). Regional Training Regiments are stationed in all 15 territorial commands of the Indonesian Army and are stationed in key Indonesian cities.

Organization 

Each RTR is led by a Commander commonly called Danrindam (Commandant of the Kodam Regional Training Regiment) who is of Colonel rank, and is organized into :
 Headquarters
 Satuan Dodik Latpur (Combat Training Command Unit)
 Satuan Dodik Kejuruan (Specialized Training Command Unit)
 Sekolah Calon Bintara (Non-Commissioned Officer Training School)
 Sekolah Calon Tamtama (Enlisted Training School)
 Satuan Dodik Bela Negara (National Defense Training Command Unit)

When the Armed Forces Reserve Component was officially activated in 2021, 6 regional Rindam regiments gained an additional reserve battalion for the training and education of reserve personnel of the Army under these battalions, which come from all sectors of society. Each reserve battalion has 550 personnel and are under the direct control of the Rindam for training purposes.

The Commandant is assisted by the RTR Executive Officer (Kesrindam) who holds the billet of a Lieutenant Colonel.

Regional NCO Training Schools 
The regional NCO Training Schools or Sekolah Calon Bintara Rindam are the training battalions for basic and advanced training of newly promoted non-commissioned officers of the army's RMCs. These battalions provide necessary training for personnel advancement into NCO status. Civilian direct entry NCO cadets also train under these units and then directly enlist into the Army as sergeants.

List of Rindam in Indonesia 
The following are the 15 Regional Training Regiments organized in each of the 15 Regional Military Commands:

References 

Indonesian Army